Sister is a 2014 American drama film directed by David Lascher and starring Reid Scott, Grace Kaufman, Serinda Swan and Barbara Hershey.

Cast
Reid Scott as Billy Presser
Serinda Swan as Melissa
Grace Kaufman as Niki Presser
Illeana Douglas as Aunt Connie
Alexis Dziena as Ashley Presser
Barbara Hershey as Susan Presser
Nadine Velazquez
John Heard

References

External links
 

American drama films
2014 drama films
2010s English-language films
2010s American films